Kyle Jordan (born 15 September 1988) is an English footballer.

Career
Jordan started his career with Sheffield Wednesday, making numerous reserve team appearances as well as scoring for the first team in a friendly against Burton Albion.

He left the Owls in September 2006 to sign for Xiangxue Sun Hei in the Hong Kong First Division League (which at the time was a fully professional league sitting at the top of the Hong Kong football league system). He was an integral part of their squad, and scored on his debut for the club in a 2–2 draw with South China AA

After his year in Hong Kong, Jordan signed for Worksop Town, and subsequently played for Sheffield F.C. and Shirebrook Town, before returning to Worksop in 2013.

References

1988 births
Living people
English footballers
English expatriate footballers
Association football forwards
Sheffield Wednesday F.C. players
Sun Hei SC players
Worksop Town F.C. players
Sheffield F.C. players
Shirebrook Town F.C. players
Handsworth F.C. players
Hong Kong First Division League players
Northern Premier League players
English expatriate sportspeople in Hong Kong
Expatriate footballers in Hong Kong